Diogué is a village and an island in the rural community of , Kataba Arrondissement, Bignona Department, Ziguinchor Region, Senegal. In 2003, there were 563 people and 78 households in Diogué.

References

Populated places in the Bignona Department
Atlantic islands of Senegal